The Govăjdia (also: Runc) is a left tributary of the river Cerna in Romania. It discharges into the Cerna in Teliucu Superior, downstream from the Cinciș Dam.

References

Rivers of Romania
Rivers of Hunedoara County